The Daily Times-Advocate, also called the Escondido Times-Advocate, was a daily newspaper published in Escondido, California. It was founded in 1909 and ceased publication as a separate title in 1995.

History
The Daily Times-Advocate was founded in 1909  following the merger of two weekly papers, The Escondido Times (founded by A. J. Lindsey in 1886) and The Escondido Advocate (founded by  A. D. Dunn in 1891). Also known later as the Escondido Times-Advocate, it was one of the longest-standing institutions in Escondido's history. It had been bought by the Appleby family in the early 1960s with Carlton R. Appleby becoming its publisher. Appleby sold the paper in 1977 to Tribune Publishing who at the time were buying up a number of other Southern California papers.

In 1995 Tribune Publishing sold its Southern California holdings, including its largest one the Times-Advocate, to Howard Publications. At the time of the sale, the Times-Advocate had a circulation of 40,000. Oceanside's North County Blade-Citizen and the Times-Advocate were merged that year to form the North County Times. That paper ceased publication as a separate title in 2013 when it was bought by the San Diego Union-Tribune and merged into the larger paper to become its North Coast edition.

The "Times-Advocate" name, which had fallen into the public domain, was revived by real estate broker Kelly Crews for a completely different publication in 2014. Crews sold that publication to the proprietor of the Valley Roadrunner in January 2016.

Former staff and contributors
In 1979 photographer Len Lahman quit his job at the Los Angeles Times to begin a one-year personal project documenting the lives of California's migrant workers and the toll their living and working conditions had taken on them. His photo essay, pioneering for its time, was rejected by numerous publications, including National Geographic. He finally found a publisher in the Times-Advocate who ran it in 1980 as a 16-page supplement entitled Faces Beyond the Border. The following year, Lehman won the Robert F. Kennedy Journalism Award for the piece. A 1987–1988 series of stories by Catherine Spearnak for the Times-Advocate and San Diego Magazine on the unsolved murders of San Diego women involved in prostitution led to the establishment of San Diego's multi-agency Metropolitan Homicide Task Force.

Other staff or contributors who worked for the newspaper in their early careers include:
James W. Huston (1953–2016), lawyer and author known for his military and legal thrillers who wrote op-eds for the Times-Advocate in the early 1990s
Mary Jacobus (1957–2009), newspaper executive and former manager of the Boston Globe who was director of sales and marketing at the Times-Advocate in the 1980s
Armen Keteyian (1953–), journalist and author who worked as a sports and feature writer for the paper from 1978 to 1980
Jim Toomey (1960–), whose comic strip Sherman's Lagoon was first published in the Times-Advocate in 1991 and went on to national syndication

References

External links
Record at the Library of Congress Chronicling America project
Wolff, Eric (November 2013). "Below the Fold: An Oral History of the North County Times". San Diego Magazine

Daily newspapers published in California
Mass media in San Diego County, California
Companies based in San Diego County, California
Defunct newspapers published in California